Anna of Saxony (7 March 1437 – 31 October 1512) was a princess of Saxony by birth and Electress of Brandenburg by marriage to Albrecht III Achilles, Elector of Brandenburg.

Life 

Anna was a daughter of the Elector Frederick II of Saxony from his marriage to Margaret of Austria, daughter of the Duke Ernest of Austria.

On 12 November 1458 Anna married Albert Achilles of Brandenburg, later Elector Albert III Achilles, in Ansbach. To further cement the tie between the House of Wettin and the House of Hohenzollern, the marriage contract also planned a marriage between Anna's brother Albert and Albert Achilles' daughter from his first marriage, Ursula, but both married children of King George of Poděbrady of Bohemia instead.

As her Wittum, Anna received Hoheneck Castle and district, plus Leutershausen and Colmberg. Through her marriage, she became stepmother to Albert Achilles's four children from his earlier marriage with Margaret of Baden. At the time of Anna's marriage, Albert Achilles held all the Franconian possessions of the Hohenzollerns. In 1470, he also inherited the Electorate of Brandenburg. In 1473 Anna agreed to a new House law, which made Mark Brandenburg indivisible, but allowed the Franconian possessions to be shared among several sons. This meant that John Cicero, Albert Achilles's son from his first marriage, would become Elector of Brandenburg, but Anna's two sons would inherit the Frankish possessions.

Albert Achilles specified in his will that Anna was entitled to income and residency in Neustadt an der Aisch, Erlangen, Dachsbach, Baiersdorf and Liebenow. Her sons, however, would retain sovereignty over those territories. Anna survived her husband by 26 years and resided mostly in Neustadt an der Aisch, where she maintained a relatively luxurious court.

Anna died in 1512 and was buried in Heilsbronn Abbey. The memorial on her tomb was built about 1502 and is still preserved.

Offspring 
Anna had thirteen children from her marriage to Albert Achilles:
 Frederick I (1460–1536), Margrave of Brandenburg-Ansbach-Kulmbach and Margrave of Brandenburg-Bayreuth
 married in 1479 princess Sophia of Poland (1464–1512)
 Amalie (1461–1481)
 married in 1478 Count Palatine Kaspar of Zweibrücken (1458–1527)
 Anna (* / † 1462)
 Barbara (1464–1515)
 married firstly in 1472 Duke Henry XI. by Crossen and Glogau (ca. 1430–1476)
 married secondly in 1476 King Vladislav II of Bohemia (1456–1516) (divorced in 1500)
 Albert (* / † 1466)
 Sibylle (1467–1524)
 married in 1481 Duke Wilhelm IV of Jülich-Berg (1455–1511)
 Siegmund (1468–1495), Margrave of Brandenburg-Kulmbach
 Albert (* / † 1470)
 Dorothea (1471–1520), Abbess in Bamberg
 George (1472–1476)
 Elisabeth (1474–1507)
 married in 1491, Count Hermann VIII of Henneberg-Aschach (1470–1535)
 Magdalene (1476–1480)
 Anastasia (1478–1534)
 married in 1500 Count William IV of Henneberg-Schleusingen (1478–1559)

Ancestors

References 

 Frederick Albert of Langenn: Duke Albrecht the Brave, the progenitor of the royal house of Saxony, p. 37 ff
 Daniel Martin Ernst Kirchner: The electresses and queens on the throne of the Hohenzollerns ..., Volume 1, 134 ff

|-

|-

|-

|-

House of Wettin
House of Hohenzollern
1437 births
1512 deaths
Electresses of Brandenburg
Burials at Heilsbronn Abbey
Daughters of monarchs